is a Japanese freestyle wrestler. She is a ten-time World Champion and four-time Olympic Champion, winning gold in 2004, 2008, 2012 and 2016. Icho was undefeated between 2003 and 2016. On 29 January 2016 at the Golden Grand Prix Ivan Yarygin 2016 Icho lost to Pürevdorjiin Orkhon of Mongolia. This was her first loss after a long domination.

She is the first female in any sport to win individual-event gold at four consecutive Olympics.
On October 20, 2016, she was awarded the People's Honour Award by Prime Minister Shinzo Abe for her achievements, the second wrestler to receive the highest award, after Saori Yoshida in 2012. She is the younger sister of Chiharu Icho.

Championships and accomplishments
Tokyo Sports
Wrestling Special Award (2002, 2003, 2004, 2005, 2006, 2011, 2012, 2013, 2014, 2015, 2016)

See also
List of multiple Olympic gold medalists
List of multiple Olympic gold medalists in one event
List of multiple Olympic medalists in one event

References

External links
 
 
 
 
 

Japanese female sport wrestlers
1984 births
Living people
Sportspeople from Aomori Prefecture
People from Hachinohe
Olympic wrestlers of Japan
Wrestlers at the 2004 Summer Olympics
Wrestlers at the 2008 Summer Olympics
Wrestlers at the 2012 Summer Olympics
Wrestlers at the 2016 Summer Olympics
Olympic gold medalists for Japan
Olympic medalists in wrestling
Medalists at the 2004 Summer Olympics
Medalists at the 2008 Summer Olympics
Medalists at the 2012 Summer Olympics
Medalists at the 2016 Summer Olympics
World Wrestling Championships medalists
Wrestlers at the 2002 Asian Games
Wrestlers at the 2006 Asian Games
Asian Games gold medalists for Japan
Asian Games silver medalists for Japan
Asian Games medalists in wrestling
Recipients of the Medal with Purple Ribbon
People's Honour Award winners
Medalists at the 2002 Asian Games
Medalists at the 2006 Asian Games
Universiade medalists in wrestling
Universiade gold medalists for Japan
Medalists at the 2005 Summer Universiade
Asian Wrestling Championships medalists
20th-century Japanese women
21st-century Japanese women